Eressa buddha is a moth of the family Erebidae. It was described by Zerny in 1931. It is found in India (Assam).

References

 Natural History Museum Lepidoptera generic names catalog

Eressa
Moths described in 1931